Bernard Williams (born October 8, 1948) is an American  former professional baseball left fielder, who played in Major League Baseball (MLB) for the San Francisco Giants (1970–1972) and San Diego Padres (1974).

Williams played in a total of 102 major league games in parts of four seasons, batting .192, with four home runs and 15 runs batted in (RBI), in 172 at bats. In addition to his appearances in the outfield, he was often used as a pinch hitter. In his MLB career, he never came close to achieving the success which he had experienced in Minor League Baseball (MiLB). Of his four big league home runs, two of them were pinch hits. After a campaign batting .313 at Triple-A Phoenix, he was traded along with Willie McCovey from the Giants to the Padres for Mike Caldwell on October 25, 1973.

After his major league career, Williams found much more success in Japan, playing for the Hankyu Braves of Nippon Professional Baseball (NPB). In six seasons there (–), he batted .258, with 96 home runs, and 294 RBI.

References

External links

Further reading
Dennis Snelling: A Glimpse of Fame, McFarland & Company, Jefferson N.C., 1993, pp. 201–215

1948 births
Living people
African-American baseball players
Alexandria Aces players
Amarillo Giants players
American expatriate baseball players in Japan
Baseball players from California
Fresno Giants players
Hankyu Braves players
Hawaii Islanders players
Major League Baseball left fielders
Medford Giants players
Sportspeople from Alameda, California
Phoenix Giants players
San Diego Padres players
San Francisco Giants players
21st-century African-American people
20th-century African-American sportspeople